Spirino is a rural locality (a village) in Chushevitskaoye Rural Settlement, Verkhovazhsky District, Vologda Oblast, Russia. The population was 29 as of 2002.

Geography 
Spirino is located 50 km southwest of Verkhovazhye (the district's administrative centre) by road. Vladykina Gora is the nearest rural locality.

References 

Rural localities in Verkhovazhsky District